The Iglesia Ni Cristo Locale of Bago Bantay is a chapel of the Philippine-based Christian sect the Iglesia ni Cristo. Located along Epifanio delos Santos Avenue (EDSA), Bago Bantay, Quezon City, it was completed on December 4, 1964, and was the third chapel dedicated by Brother Erano Manalo upon the death of Brother Felix Y. Manalo in 1963. Currently, it is the only INC chapel located along EDSA.

Designed by architect Carlos A. Santos-Viola and based on the last design conceptualized by Brother Manalo himself, the chapel was the first to be built with a steep gable and an arcaded side facade. It is the second-largest chapel ever built during its time. Its interiors feature the widest nave built during its time and also one of the highest in terms of floor to ceiling height. The overall design was inspired by the Gothic cathedrals of Europe, particularly San Sebastian Church in Manila.

After the ceiling collapsed in July 2015, the chapel underwent an extensive renovation and was rededicated on July 18, 2016. The interior now features a new design which uses Narra wood panels. The tiles were replaced by high-gloss granite tiles. The choir loft was fitted with digital pipe organ speakers. Finally, the exterior was restored to its original color scheme.

References

External links

Bago Bantay
Churches in Quezon City
Buildings and structures in Quezon City
Churches completed in 1964
20th-century religious buildings and structures in the Philippines